Guy Sacre (born 1948) is a French composer, pianist and musical critic.

Biography 
He is best known for writing La Musique de piano, a critical census of a large part of the piano repertoire, dealing with some 4,000 works by 272 composers.

In his compositions, Guy Sacre tries to reconnect with the French musical tradition: he is the author of Vingt-Quatre préludes and Mélodies after poems by Paul Verlaine, Jean Cocteau and Guillaume Apollinaire. 

With Billy Eidi he created the association "Contrechants" intended to rediscover an unknown repertoire ("Piano au Palais-Royal" concerts from 1991 to 1995, in collaboration with the Bibliothèque nationale).

Guy Sacre is also author of radio broadcasts (Radio Suisse Romande) and conferences centered on themes of musical and literary aesthetics, such as "la musique et les éléments", "Vigny et le silence", "Apollinaire poète du souvenir", and the "masques et bergamasques" which gather Fauré and Debussy around Verlaine and Watteau.

Critical works 
 La Musique de piano, Paris, éditions Robert Laffont, series "Bouquins" (2 volumes), 1998

Compositions 
Non-exhaustive list (to be completed)

Works for piano 
 1982: Thème varié
 1979: Piccolissima-Sérénade
 1981–1982 : Deuxième Sérénade
 1989: Variations sur une mazurka de Chopin
 1993: 24 Préludes
 Chansons enfantines

Vocal music 
 1976: Cartes postales (on 4 poems by Jean Cocteau)
 1980–1982: Clair-Obscur for baritone and piano (on 4 poems by Jean Cocteau)
 1982: L'Exécution for baritone and piano (on 1 poem by Jean Cocteau)
 1978–1982: Six poèmes de "Vocabulaire" for voice and piano (on 6 poems by Jean Cocteau)
 1986–1990: "L'Album de Poil de Carotte" for voice and piano (on 9 texts by Jules Renard)
 Cinq Poésies de Georges Schehadé
 Cinq Poèmes de Guillaume Apollinaire
 Sept Phrases pour Éventails
 Six Nouveaux Éventails
 Trois Poèmes de Verlaine
 Trois Poèmes de Robert Desnos
 Quatre Exemples tirés des "Nécessités de la vie"
 Trois Poésies de Georges Schehadé
 Mauvais Cœur

Discography 
 Mélodies and Mélodies - 2, performed by Jean-François Gardeil, Florence Katz and Billy Eidi on the Timpani label. 
 Œuvres pour piano and Œuvres pour piano - 2, performed by Billy Eidi on the same label.

External links 
 L'enfance dans la musique de Guy Sacre on Mairie de Paris
 Guy Sacre. La musique de piano: dictionnaire des compositeurs et des œuvres
 Guy Sacre Prelude n°4 ( 1993 ) by Nicolas Horvath on YouTube
 Site de l'éditeur Symétrie

20th-century French essayists
20th-century French musicologists
Classical music critics
French composers
1948 births
Living people